The National Organization of the Anvil or simply El Yunque (in English: The Anvil) is the name of an alleged conservative Mexican secret society, whose existence was first claimed by journalist Alvaro Delgado in 2003.

Organization
Delgado described The Anvil as "ultracatholic, anticommunist, antisemitic, antiliberal and with fascistic traits". He also claims that top members of PAN and former President Vicente Fox's cabinet are also members of El Yunque. The organization was allegedly formed in Puebla in the early 1950s.

Since it is allegedly a secret organization, most reports about it comes from its critics and alleged ex-members. One noted, purported ex-member is the former mayor of Puebla, Luis Paredes Moctezuma who has led demonstrations against the organization, demanding the expulsion of all heads of PAN who are also affiliated to El Yunque. Paredes Moctezuma has also explicitly pointed current party leader Manuel Espino Barrientos as a yunquista. He has said that El Yunque played a role backing Vicente Fox's campaign in 2000.

In 2007, Paredes claimed the group controlled four state governments in Mexico and that it established cells in the United States in the early 1990s, saying, "They're in Dallas, in Boston, in Washington, D.C., in Los Angeles, in Miami." A poor quality video of what appeared to be a Yunque initiation ceremony featuring unidentified men and Yunque symbolism appeared on YouTube, in which one man explains that the goal of the organization is to conquer Mexico and Latin America, but the video may have been staged. 

Parades claimed The Anvil was formed in the early 1950s as a reaction to anti-Catholic sentiment under the Institutional Revolutionary Party (PRI). He says it attracted religious students who sought to counter the leftist influence reflected in the Cuban revolution and communist China and the Soviet Union. He says the group opposed PAN member Felipe Calderon's Presidential candidacy and is thus in a poor position to influence him.

According to its critics, the secret organization of El Yunque was supposedly paramilitary in nature, performing its actions (including political assassination mostly through a set of front organizations) and, according to the magazine Contralínea, this included the student organization MURO at the National Autonomous University of Mexico in the 1960s.<ref>[http://www.contralinea.com.mx/c16/html/politica/cara.html CARA, La Extrema Derecha de El Yunque] "Revista Contralínea"</ref>

Skepticism
Members of PAN have condemned Delgado's claims as "pure fiction", comparing it to the mythical monster, the chupacabra, and saying that El Yunque has nothing to do with the party. Delgado has been accused of inventing the organization in order to sway the 2006 Mexican Elections. A former PAN Presidential candidate and party head, Luis H. Alvarez, said that he believed the organization was real but negligible. One political commentator dismissed claims about the group as an easy way to smear political opponents, "I have never found anyone who admits to being a member of El Yunque. All I see are attacks from the left. It's an easy way to dismiss someone."

 El Yunque in Spain 

In 2012, Delgado now reported that El Yunque had spread to Spain, influencing the conservative People's Party. He would later report a connection between El Yunque and the far-right political party Vox.

In 2014, a Spanish judge declared there was possibly evidence to show a relationship between members of the association HazteOir (HO) and El Yunque. However, she could not say with certainty that such an organization exists. It has also been linked to CitizenGO, a foundation created by HazteOir. (HO was later subsumed under CitizenGO.)

References

Further reading
 El Yunque - La ultraderecha en el poder'' (The Anvil – The extreme right in power),  by Álvaro Delgado, 2003.
 Official summary of the televised interview about El Yunque granted by Álvaro Delgado to Carlos Loret de Mola on June 21, 2004.
 YoInfluyo.com ("I Influence.com"), a web site that Álvaro Delgado of Proceso magazine has claimed to be run by El Yunque (as reported by Noticieros Televisa ), lobbying for conservative viewpoints in Mexican politics.
 

Yunque, El
Yunque, El
Yunque, El
Yunque, El
1955 establishments in Mexico
American secret societies
Conspiracy theories in Mexico